The Colegio de Nuestra Señora del Pilar  (in English: The School of Our Lady of the Pillar), is a catholic school located in Madrid, Spain. It is often referred to as "El Pilar".

It is a state-funded private day school for pupils from 3 to 18 years of age located in Calle de Castelló, in the Salamanca district.

History 
It was founded in 1907 by the Society of Mary, a Roman Catholic teaching order of priests and religious brothers, who still continue to operate the institution. Founded as a boys' school, it first admitted girls in 1978 and progressively became fully co-educational. El Pilar has educated one Spanish Prime Minister and numerous prominent public figures in the history of Spain.

References

External links 

Buildings and structures in Salamanca District, Madrid
Bien de Interés Cultural landmarks in Madrid
Gothic Revival architecture in Madrid
Schools in Madrid
Educational institutions established in 1907
1907 establishments in Spain